Hagström, Häggström, Hagstrom and Haggstrom are surnames of Swedish origin which may refer to:

Hagström
Albin Hagström (1905–1952), Swedish accordion manufacturer
Annika Hagström (born 1942), Swedish journalist, singer, and author
Emil Hagström (1893–1941), Swedish sailor who competed in the 1912 Olympics
Göte Hagström (1918–2014), Swedish athlete who competed mainly in the 3000 metre steeplechase
Johanna Hagström, (born 1998), Swedish cross-country skier
Mårten Hagström (born 1971), Swedish  musician
Peter Hagström (born 1967), Swedish former professional ice hockey player
Stig Hagström (1932–2011), Swedish professor emeritus in materials science and engineering at Stanford University
Sven Hagströmer (born 1943), Swedish businessman and co-founder of Hagströmer & Qviberg

Häggström
Johan Häggström, (born 1992), Swedish cross-country skier
Nils Häggström (1885–1974), Swedish modern pentathlete who competed in the 1912 Summer Olympics
Peter Häggström (born 1976), Swedish athlete who competed in the long jump
Olle Häggström (born 1967), Swedish professor of mathematical statistics

Companies
Hagström, a Swedish manufacturer of musical instruments
Hagström H8, a mass-produced eight-stringed bass guitar
Hagström Jimmy, an archtop jazz guitar built by Hagström and Jimmy D'Aquisto
Hagström HJ-500 and Hagström HJ-600, reissues of the Hagström Jimmy
Hagström Swede Patch 2000, world's first guitar/synthesizer hybrid
Hagström Viking, Hagström's first semi-acoustic guitar
Hagstrom Map, a mapmaker specializing in the New York City metropolitan region

Other
 "Haggstrom", a song from the album Minecraft – Volume Alpha by C418

See also
Hagströmer & Qviberg, a Swedish finance and banking corporation

Swedish-language surnames